Gjoko Hadžievski or Ǵoko Hadžievski (born 31 March 1955) is a football coach from North Macedonia who is currently the manager of Najran.

He coached teams from Bulgaria (CSKA Sofia, Vihren Sandanski), Greece (Kastoria, Doxa Drama), Azerbaijan (FK Baku), Japan (Júbilo Iwata), Saudi Arabia (Najran SC), and North Macedonia.

Playing career

Club
He played for Teteks and Pelister.

Managerial career
Hadžievski started his coaching career at FK Pelister.

He resigned as coach for FK Vardar in summer 2003, and Zoran Stratev took his position.

Between March 2004 and December 2005, he was the coach of Doxa Drama.

Between August 2006 and February 2007, he was the coach of Vihren Sandanski.

Hadžievski was hired as coach of FK Baku in summer 2007.

On 31 October 2007, he was named as caretaker coach of Azerbaijan, as Shahin Diniyev resigned.

He won the Azerbaijan Premier League title with FK Baku in 2009.

In December 2014, Hadžievski again become a coach of FK Pelister, but in May 2015, after a relegation of Pelister from the Macedonian First League, Hadžievski was resigned as a coach.

Honours and awards
Macedonian First League: 5 
Winner: 1993, 1994, 1995, 2002 and 2003
Yugoslav Second League: 1
Runner-up: 1991
Macedonian Cup: 2
Winner: 1993 and 1995
Macedonian Republic Cup: 1
Winner: 1992
Japanese Super Cup: 1
Winner: 2000
Azerbaijan Premier League: 1
Winner: 2009

Managerial statistics

Notes

External links
Profile at Kastoria 

1955 births
Living people
Sportspeople from Bitola
Association football midfielders
Yugoslav footballers
Macedonian footballers
FK Teteks players
FK Pelister players
Yugoslav Second League players
Macedonian football managers
FK Pelister managers
FK Vardar managers
PFC CSKA Sofia managers
FK Vojvodina managers
North Macedonia national football team managers
FK Sileks managers
Júbilo Iwata managers
Kastoria F.C. managers
Doxa Drama F.C. managers
OFC Vihren Sandanski managers
FC Baku managers
Azerbaijan national football team managers
Atromitos F.C. managers
Simurq PIK managers
Najran SC managers
Al-Taawoun FC managers
Al-Qadisiyah FC managers
Hatta Club managers
Al Dhafra FC managers
FK Belasica managers
Emirates Club managers
Hajer Club managers
J1 League managers
Saudi Professional League managers
UAE Pro League managers
Saudi First Division League managers
Macedonian expatriate football managers
Expatriate football managers in Bulgaria
Macedonian expatriate sportspeople in Bulgaria
Expatriate football managers in Serbia and Montenegro
Macedonian expatriate sportspeople in Serbia and Montenegro
Expatriate football managers in Japan
Macedonian expatriate sportspeople in Japan
Expatriate football managers in Greece
Macedonian expatriate sportspeople in Greece
Expatriate football managers in Azerbaijan
Macedonian expatriate sportspeople in Azerbaijan
Expatriate football managers in Saudi Arabia
Macedonian expatriate sportspeople in Saudi Arabia
Expatriate football managers in the United Arab Emirates